Andraž Lipolt (born 24 April 1974) is a Slovenian sports shooter. He competed in the men's trap event at the 2000 Summer Olympics.

References

1974 births
Living people
Slovenian male sport shooters
Olympic shooters of Slovenia
Shooters at the 2000 Summer Olympics
Sportspeople from Ljubljana